Lukáš Zápotoka (born 23 September 1985, in Bardejov) is a Slovak football midfielder who currently plays for the 2. liga club Partizán Bardejov.

References

External links

at mfkkarvina.cz

1985 births
Living people
Slovak footballers
Association football midfielders
FK Dubnica players
FC DAC 1904 Dunajská Streda players
MFK Karviná players
Partizán Bardejov players
Slovak Super Liga players
People from Bardejov
Sportspeople from the Prešov Region